Patriarch John I may refer to:

 John Talaia, Patriarch John I of Alexandria in 481–482
 Pope John I (II) of Alexandria, ruled in 496–505
 John I, Maronite Patriarch (designation contended among various people)

See also
 Patriarch John (disambiguation)